The United States women's national ice hockey team is controlled by USA Hockey. The U.S. has been one of the most successful women's ice hockey teams in international play, having medaled in every major tournament.

In 1998, the women's Olympic hockey team was named the USOC Team of the Year. In April 2015, the women's national ice hockey team was named the USOC Team of the Month.

Tournament record

Olympic Games

World Championship
1990 – 
1991 – Tournament not held
1992 – 
1993 – Tournament not held
1994 – 
1995 – Tournament not held, the U.S. competed in the Pacific Rim Championship instead
1996 – Tournament not held, the U.S. competed in the Pacific Rim Championship instead
1997 – 
1998 – Tournament not held due to the 1998 Winter Olympics
1999 – 
2000 – 
2001 – 
2002 – Tournament not held due to the 2002 Winter Olympics
2003 – Tournament cancelled due to the SARS crisis
2004 – 
2005 – 
2006 – Tournament not held due to the 2006 Winter Olympics
2007 – 
2008 – 
2009 – 
2010 – Tournament not held due to the 2010 Winter Olympics
2011 – 
2012 – 
2013 – 
2014 – Tournament not held due to the 2014 Winter Olympics
2015 – 
2016 – 
2017 – 
2018 – Tournament not held due to the 2018 Winter Olympics
2019 – 
2020 – Tournament cancelled due to the COVID-19 pandemic
2021 – 
2022 –

3/4 Nations Cup
1996 – 
1997 – 
1998 – 
1999 – 
2000 – 
2001 – Withdrew due to the September 11 attacks 
2002 – 
2003 – 
2004 – 
2005 – 
2006 – 
2007 – 
2008 – 
2009 – 
2010 – 
2011 – 
2012 – 
2013 – 
2014 – 
2015 – 
2016 – 
2017 – 
2018 – 
2019 – Tournament cancelled due to contract disputes between the Swedish Ice Hockey Association and Swedish national team''

Pacific Rim Championship
1995 – 
1996 –

Team

Current roster
Roster for the February 2023 Rivalry Series vs. Canada.

Head coach: John Wroblewski

Development team roster
Roster for the 2022 Collegiate Series.

Head coach: Allison Coomey

Facilities
For the 2010 Olympics, the team's training and development program was located in Blaine, Minnesota, at the Schwan Super Rink, the largest ice facility in the world. For the 2014 Olympics, the team's training was located in the Greater Boston region at the Edge Sports Center in Bedford, Massachusetts, while off-ice fitness facility was located at the Mike Boyle Strength & Conditioning Center in Woburn, Massachusetts.

Threatened 2017 World Championship boycott
On March 15, 2017, players for the U.S. women's ice hockey team announced that they would boycott the 2017 World Championship over inequitable support and conditions for women's ice hockey unless concessions were made by USA Hockey. Members of the team including captain Meghan Duggan made public statements regarding poor pay and conditions for female hockey players. The players were publicly supported by the players' associations for the NBA, WNBA, MLB and the NHLPA. On March 28, 2017, the players agreed to play in the World Championship after an agreement was struck with USA Hockey to increase player pay and support for women's development.

See also
List of United States national women's ice hockey team rosters
List of Olympic women's ice hockey players for the United States

References

Further reading

External links

IIHF profile

 
Women's national
Women's national ice hockey teams
1987 establishments in the United States
National ice hockey teams in the Americas